According to Māori mythology, Pūhaorangi is a celestial being who descended from the heavens to sleep with the beautiful maiden Te Kuraimonoa. From this union came the revered ancestor Ohomairangi.

Pūhaorangi is a powerful celestial deity associated with the cosmic halo and was the protector of Rangiātea which is the name of the house of the Creator in the heavens.

It is because of this celestial origin that Ohomairangi and his descendants are known as Te Heketanga a Rangi (Descent of Heaven) a title carried by the navigator and explorer Ngatoroirangi.

References

Māori gods